Elections to the post of Chief Minister were held in the Gilbert Islands on 17 March 1978. The result was a victory for Ieremia Tabai, who won 55.6% of the vote. Voter turnout was 73.5%.

This was the first election in which a head of government who is not the head of state was elected to the post directly by the public, and the only one of its kind to occur outside Israel.

Background
Following the February 1978 parliamentary elections, five candidates were nominated for the post of Chief Minister. However, the constitution only allowed for four members to be put to voters. Incumbent Chief Minister Naboua Ratieta was the one candidate to fail to progress to the public election.

Results

References

Gilbert Islands
1978 in the Gilbert Islands
Elections in Kiribati
Non-partisan elections
Gilbert Islands 1978
Election and referendum articles with incomplete results